The Sand Fire was a wildfire in 2016 that burned in the Angeles National Forest, east of the Santa Clarita Valley in Los Angeles County, California. The fire, named for the area's Sand Canyon, was fueled by heavy chaparral and brush.

The fire

The fire started around 2:10 p.m. on July 22, 2016 near the intersection Soledad Canyon Road and Sand Canyon Road. By 10 P.M., less than 8 hours after it was reported, the fire had burned at least .

The Santa Clarita Valley remained under a Red flag warning throughout the 23rd with temperatures reaching  and sustained  winds. Mandatory evacuations had been issued for parts of Sand Canyon, Placerita Canyon, and Little Tujunga Canyon areas. Hundreds of birds and animals were also evacuated from the Wildlife WayStation sanctuary in Little Tujunga Canyon.

Officials from the Los Angeles County Sheriff's Department confirmed Saturday night that a male's body had been found in the burn area. The body, which was located on North Iron Canyon Road well within the mandatory evacuation area, was identified as Robert Bresnick, a 67-year-old man who had been visiting a friend in the area and had refused to evacuate.

Sunday afternoon officials confirmed that Sable Ranch, a popular filming location, had been destroyed by the fire. Popular shows including Maverick, The A-Team and 24 were all filmed at Sable Ranch.

By Monday July 25, the fire had reach an estimated  with 40% of the perimeter contained. Officials announced that at 7 p.m. most residents would be allowed to return home, with the exception of residents living on Placerita Canyon Road and Tujunga Canyon Road.

Officials announced on August 3 that the fire was 100% contained after burning  of land

Effects
According to the United States Forest Service, 3,379 firefighters were assigned to the fire which prompted the evacuation of at least 10,000 homes. On Tuesday July 26, Los Angeles county declared a state of emergency, with over  burned. Acting Gov. Tom Torlakson, the state's top education official who was filling in  while Gov. Jerry Brown attended the 2016 Democratic National Convention in Philadelphia, issued the emergency order, a move that helped quickly get aid to affected communities.

The fire grew over 10,000 acres just on Sunday alone. 18 homes were burned, according to John Tripp, who is the Los County Fire Chief. A male-identified body was seen in a burned car, in Santa Clarita, a consequence of the fire. Popular movie shoot location, Sable Ranch was burned, where movies like Chevy Chase and Robin Hodd were shot. Three firefighters were protecting the community, blazing out the fires, when one firefighter named Toscano, heard that he lost his home. A Go-Fund me was raised for Toscano and his family. In total, there were 900 firefighters against the flames, where the fighters found the mountain-terrain to be challenging to put out the fires. On Monday, researchers and experts suggested active winds in the range of 15-30 mph on Tuesday. The communities of Sand Canyon and Placerita Canyon both had evacuation orders in place for safety measures for the citizens.

See also
2016 California wildfires

References

External links
Sand Fire maps at InciWeb

2016 California wildfires
Wildfires in Los Angeles County, California
July 2016 events in the United States
August 2016 events in the United States